Robertson's May mean
Robertson's, a British jam and marmalade company
Robertson Company also known as Robertson’s department store, Hollywood, California
Robertson’s department store, South Bend, Indiana
Robertson's Hams